Band Aman (also Romanized as Band Amān; also known as Band Āmūn and Bandāmūn) is a village in Fazl Rural District, Zarrin Dasht District, Nahavand County, Hamadan Province, Iran. At the 2006 census, its population was 200, in 55 families.

References 

Populated places in Nahavand County